Jharkhand Public Service Commission, commonly known as JPSC is a state agency of Jharkhand constituted to recruit the candidates, conduct written competitive examinations and the interviews for state civil services and other examination in its jurisdiction.

History 
The history of JPSC started with merging 18 districts of Bihar that led the foundation of Jharkhand state accompanied with its state civil service commission under the provision of Article, 315, a part of Constitution of India. It came into existence in 15 November 2000.

Functions and responsibilities
The commission is permitted to function in accordance with the constitution of India and Union Public Service Commission which provides it the state public service commission amendments.
Making recruitments to civil services and departmental posts.
Conducting competitive examinations in the state.
Conducting interviews, screening tests, and written test.
Advising to state government on the suitability of officers for their appointment on promotion.
Transferring the civil service officers from one service to another.
Heading disciplinary cases under its jurisdiction.

Commission profile
The Commission is supervised under the state governor and headed by commission's Chairman and members for their specific roles.

See also

 List of Public service commissions in India

References 

Government of Jharkhand
Government agencies established in 2000
Civil Services of India
2000 establishments in Jharkhand